Sandra McLellan (born 18 May 1961) is a former Irish Sinn Féin politician who served as a Teachta Dála (TD) for the Cork East constituency from 2011 to 2016.

Prior to being elected to the Dáil, she worked as a SIPTU shop steward. She was elected in 2004 as a member of Youghal Town Council, and in 2009 as a member of Cork County Council for the Midleton electoral area. She is a former Mayor of Youghal.

She did not contest the 2016 general election.

References

 

1961 births
Living people
Irish trade unionists
Local councillors in County Cork
Mayors of places in the Republic of Ireland
Members of the 31st Dáil
21st-century women Teachtaí Dála
Politicians from County Cork
Sinn Féin TDs (post-1923)
Women mayors of places in Ireland
People from Youghal